Lough Cullin is a lake in County Mayo in Ireland. With its immediate neighbour to the north, Lough Conn, it is connected to the Atlantic by the River Moy. Lough Cullin is noted for its trout and salmon fishing.

In Celtic mythology, Lough Cullin was created when Fionn mac Cumhaill was hunting with his hounds; Cullin and Conn. They came across a wild boar. Finn and the hounds attempted to chase it. However, as the boar ran, water poured from its feet. The hounds ran ahead of Finn and eventually Conn was ahead of Cullin. Conn chased the boar for days until a lake appeared. The boar swam back to land but Conn was drowned. This happened again in the south to Cullin.

See also
List of loughs in Ireland

References

Cullin